Tsiafajavona  is the third highest mountain in the Madagascar, rising  above sea level. It is situated in the Ankaratra massif, in a distance of  West of Ambatolampy.

References 
MIndat.org
Britannica
VTT Madagascar

External links 

Mountains of Madagascar
Mountains of Vakinankaratra